Def Jam's How to Be a Player is a 1997 American sex comedy film, starring Bill Bellamy, Natalie Desselle and Bernie Mac. The film was directed by Lionel C. Martin, and written by Mark Brown and Demetria Johnson.

The How to Be a Player Soundtrack, released by Def Jam Recordings on August 5, 1997, featured the hit single "Big Bad Mamma" by Foxy Brown featuring Dru Hill.

Plot

Drayton "Dray" Jackson (Bill Bellamy), who works as an A&R representative for Def Jam Recordings, is a playboy with only one goal in life: to have sex with as many women as possible. He dreams that he gets caught cheating on his girlfriend, Lisa, (Lark Voorhies) only to wake up from the dream to remind him not to get caught. The women he sleeps with are all a secret from Lisa, who comes over to his house for a bit to see him, before heading off for work. Dray's sister, Jenny, (Natalie Desselle) also comes by his house to remind him about the cookout. Dray becomes fascinated with Jenny's friend Katrina (Mari Morrow), and invites her to a party his friend is hosting; she tells him that she is busy.

Jenny cannot stand Dray's way of treating women. As soon as Dray leaves, she and Katrina snoop around and find Dray's mobile black book of his women. Jenny plans to set Dray up at the party in a hostile environment, hoping that Dray, if he gets caught, will reform his ways. After Jenny and Katrina call the women and receive their numbers, they both leave.

Dray makes his daily rounds of sex with his women, including his three main ones: Robin (Beverly Johnson), a married woman, Amber (Amber Smith), a sexy thespian, and Sherri (Stacii Jae Johnson), a freaky dominatrix.  Afterwards, Dray goes to the cookout briefly before continuing on to the party. When he sees all of the women there, including Jenny and Katrina, he understands that he has been set up by them.  He figures out a way get all of the women out of the party, without them noticing about each other and confrontation about Dray. He then heads to Jenny and Katrina to explain that when a player is put in a hostile environment, a player doesn't reform: he adapts to the situation. Dray leaves to go home and wait for Lisa to come see him after a long day at work.

While Dray is waiting for Lisa, Katrina shows up at the last minute to apologize.  However, she has become fascinated with Dray and has been fantasizing about him. Before leaving, she makes a move on Dray and they have sex, apparently fulfilling her fantasy.  Lisa returns, but Katrina is able to leave without her noticing. However as Lisa changes into her nightwear, she sees a dress, bra, and heels with smears of lipstick spelling out: "Busted, Adapt." Realizing that Katrina has set him up, Dray knows that he finally got caught.

Cast
Bill Bellamy —  Drayton "Dray" Jackson
Natalie Desselle —  Jennifer "Jenny" Jackson
Lark Voorhies — Lisa
Mari Morrow — Katrina
Pierre Edwards — David
Bernie Mac — Buster
BeBe Drake - Mama Jackson
Jermaine 'Huggy' Hopkins — Kilo
Anthony Johnson — Spootie
Max Julien — Uncle Fred
Beverly Johnson — Robin
Gilbert Gottfried — Tony the Doorman
Stacii Jae Johnson — Sherri
Elise Neal — Nadine
J. Anthony Brown — Uncle Snook
Amber Smith — Amber
Jerod Mixon — Kid #1
Jamal Mixon — Kid #2

Soundtrack

References

External links 
 
 
 
 
 

1997 films
Gramercy Pictures films
African-American comedy films
1997 comedy films
PolyGram Filmed Entertainment films
1997 directorial debut films
1990s English-language films
1990s American films